Tristiropsis is a genus of about 14 flowering trees species, of the plant family Sapindaceae.

Selected species
 Tristiropsis acutangula  – New Guinea, New Britain, New Ireland, Moluccas, Sulawesi, Borneo, Philippines, Flores, Timor, Solomon Islands, Palau, Guam –Malesia, NE. Qld Australia, Christmas Island
 Tristiropsis apetala  – Papua New Guinea
 Tristiropsis canarioides  – New Guinea, Qld Australia
 Tristiropsis ferruginea  – Borneo
 Tristiropsis subangula  – New Guinea

References

External links

Sapindaceae
Sapindaceae genera